Carl Ogden (August 27, 1929 – November 5, 2013) was an American insurance company executive and politician from Florida. He served in the Air Force and lived on a farm in Monticello, Florida. He was a Democrat and was a member of the Florida House of Representatives for 20 years. After he left the state house, Governor Bob Martinez appointed Ogden as director of the state’s employee insurance program.

Ogden was part of helicopter missions during the Korean War. After the helicopter he was in was shot down, he and a pilot escaped from a prisoner of war camp. He received a Silver Star and Purple Heart for his service.

References

External links

Duvall County Town Meeting (October 4, 1984)

1929 births
2013 deaths
Democratic Party members of the Florida House of Representatives
20th-century American politicians
United States Air Force personnel of the Korean War
People from Monticello, Florida
Businesspeople from Florida
American businesspeople in insurance
20th-century American businesspeople